Rajbari-2 is a constituency represented in the Jatiya Sangsad (National Parliament) of Bangladesh since 2008 by Zillu Hakim of the Awami League.

Boundaries 
The constituency encompasses Pangsha, Kalukhali and Baliakandi upazilas.

Members of Parliament

Elections

References

External links
 

Parliamentary constituencies in Bangladesh
Rajbari District